North Pier Light may refer to:
Duluth North Pier Light in Duluth, Minnesota
Erie Harbor North Pier Light on Presque Isle in Erie, Pennsylvania
Kenosha North Pier Light in Kenosha County, Wisconsin
Sturgeon Bay Canal North Pierhead Light near Sturgeon Bay in Door County, Wisconsin